The 1975 American League Championship Series pitted the Boston Red Sox against the three-time defending World Series champion Oakland Athletics for the right to advance to the World Series. The Red Sox swept the series in three games to win their first AL pennant in eight years, which ended Oakland's pursuit of a fourth consecutive World Series title.

Background
During the regular season, the Red Sox posted a  record to win their first American League East division title, while the A's went  to take the American League West for the fifth consecutive season.

The Red Sox had experienced players such as Carl Yastrzemski, Carlton Fisk, and Dwight Evans, and two sensational rookies – Fred Lynn and Jim Rice. Lynn took most of the headlines by playing a flawless center field, hitting .331 with 21 home runs and 105 RBIs, and was the first major league player to win the MVP and Rookie of the Year awards in the same season. Despite suffering a broken wrist in late September, Rice finished with a .309 average, 22 homers, and 102 RBIs.

Summary

Oakland A's vs. Boston Red Sox

Game summaries

Game 1

Boston starter Luis Tiant allowed just one run on three hits to defeat the A's, 7–1, in the ALCS opener. Tiant struck out eight and walked three in a complete game effort, retiring the side in order in four innings. Juan Beníquez went 2-for-4 with an RBI and a run scored, Fred Lynn ended 1-for-4 with two RBIs, and Carlton Fisk went 1-for-4 with two runs scored for the Red Sox. Oakland starter Ken Holtzman was saddled with the loss by yielding five hits and four runs (two unearned) with four strikeouts and a walk in  innings of work.

Game 2

Carl Yastrzemski hit a two-run home run to lead the Red Sox past the Athletics, 6–3, in Game 2. Boston starter Reggie Cleveland was solid through five innings, allowing three runs on five hits with two strikeouts and one walk. Rico Petrocelli also homered, Carlton Fisk went 2-for-4 with an RBI and a run scored, and Fred Lynn went 2-for-4 with one RBI for the Red Sox. A's starter Vida Blue lasted three innings and gave up just three runs on six hits. The win went to Roger Moret, who tossed one scoreless inning of relief, and Dick Drago worked the final three innings to close out the contest. Rollie Fingers took the loss, allowing three runs on five hits over four innings. Reggie Jackson hit a two-run homer and Sal Bando went 4-for-4 with two doubles and a run for the A's.

Game 3

After three consecutive championships, the Athletics' dynasty came to an end, as the Red Sox took the third game, 5-3, to sweep the series, their first series win since 1918. Boston starter Rick Wise allowed three runs (two unearned) on six hits in  innings of work. Both Denny Doyle and Carlton Fisk collected two hits with one run and an RBI, and Rick Burleson went 2-for-4 with one run scored to pace the Red Sox. On just two days' rest, Ken Holtzman started for Oakland and was tagged for four runs on seven hits in just  innings to take his second loss in the series. Dick Drago earned the save for pitching  innings of shutout ball for Boston while Carl Yastrzemski made two great defensive plays in left field and collected two hits. Sal Bando went 2-for-4 with two RBIs while Reggie Jackson went 2-for-4 with one RBI for the A's.

This game, and Game 3 of the National League Championship Series, were the first LCS games ever played at night; both were regionally televised by NBC.

Composite box
1975 ALCS (3–0): Boston Red Sox over Oakland A's

References

External links
1975 ALCS at Baseball-Reference
1975 ALCS Official Scorebook Magazine

American League Championship Series
American League Championship Series
Boston Red Sox postseason
Oakland Athletics postseason
American League Championship Series
American League Championship Series
American League Championship Series
Baseball competitions in Boston
20th century in Oakland, California
American League Championship Series
Baseball competitions in Oakland, California